Nyköping Municipality in Sweden held a municipal election on 19 September 2010. This was part of the local elections and held on the same day as the general election.

Results
The number of seats remained at 61 with the Social Democrats winning the most at 23, a drop of three from 2006.

By constituency

Urban and rural votes

Percentages

By votes

Electoral wards
There were three constituencies: Eastern, Northern and Western. Helgona, Herrhagen, Högbrunn and Väster had a minority of their electorates located in sparsely populated rural areas, but were predominantly in the Nyköping urban area.

Nyköping

Rural areas

References

Nyköping municipal elections
Nyköping